The Radio tractor was a mobile Signal Corps Radio used by the U.S. Army for ground communications before and during World War I. Prior to World War I, trucks were referred to as "tractors", and there were also telegraph tractors, and telephone tractors.

Use
Very little information exists for these trucks, as most of the components were built before standardization. They first made their debut on the Mexican border in a radio intercept role, and later during World War I, some sets may have been reconfigured for RDF and other uses.

Components
 SCR-50, 2 kilowatt spark transmitter, crystal or vacuum tube detector receiver, 0.15-0.50 Megahertz

Variants

At least 3 variants are known:

 Radio Tractor No. 1
 Radio Tractor No. 2 (Four Wheel Drive)(Jeffery Quad), Unknown radio set
 Radio Tractor No. 3 (White Motor Company), SCR-50 radio set

The No.3 truck was also accompanied by a tender "Maintenance truck No. 5" later renumbered as K-5.

See also

 Signal Corps Radio
 SCR-108
 Crystal radio
 List of U.S. Signal Corps vehicles

References
 Signal Corps Storage Catalog 
 Annual Report 1919  page 249
 1918 Military Signal Corps manual 
 New York Times 1915 
 Electrical world vol. 66 
 The Wireless Age 
 Automobile journal Vol. 39 
 https://web.archive.org/web/20121012130248/http://www.nsa.gov/public_info/_files/cryptologic_spectrum/umbrellas.pdf

External links
 https://web.archive.org/web/20100413132056/http://www.gordon.army.mil/ocos/museum/equipment.asp scr and bc lists

Amateur radio transmitters
Military radio systems of the United States
World War I American electronics
Military electronics of the United States
Radio during World War I